Güzeloluk Mosque is a 19th-century mosque in Güzeloluk village of Mersin Province, Turkey

Geography
Güzeloluk is a village in Erdemli district of Mersin Province.

History
Güzeloluk Mosque is unique in Erdemli villages as being the only historical mosque. According to the inscription of the mosque it was built in 1873. But the minaret was added in 1908. Although the minaret was partially demolished in 1970 as a result of a thunderbolt, it was repaired in 1978. According to the official plaque hanged on the wall, the mosque was commissioned by the village people. But according to an academic report the mosque was commissioned by a certain Böcüoğlu İbrahim .  Its architects were  Ottoman Armenians named Todiri and his assistant Nikolos.

Building
The building material is stone.

Although it is an Ottoman mosque, the non-Muslim architect Todiri has introduced some church elements like unusually decorated minbar and the portal of the building.

References

1873 establishments in the Ottoman Empire
Buildings and structures in Mersin Province
Erdemli District
Ottoman mosques in Mersin
Mosques completed in 1873
19th-century religious buildings and structures in Turkey